Namp'ohang station is a freight-only railway station in Haean-dong, Hanggu-guyŏk, Namp'o Special City, North Korea. It is the terminus of the Namp'ohang Line from Namp'o on the P'yŏngnam Line of the Korean State Railway.

The station was opened by the Korean State Railway after the end of the Korean War to serve a petroleum storage tank farm, the Namp'o Glass Bottle Factory, and the Namp'o Shipyard complex.

References

Railway stations in North Korea